Bernard J. Taylor is a writer and composer of musicals and stage plays. His stage works have been produced around the world and translated into German, Romanian, Polish, Hungarian, Spanish and Italian. He is also the writer of 14 novels and three non-fiction books.

Taylor was born and educated in Cape Town, South Africa. His forebears included John Taylor, the first British missionary to southern Africa. He left South Africa for England in 1969 and remained in England until 1998, after which he spent a year in Australia before settling in the United States. He lives in San Antonio, Texas.

Music and musicals
Taylor has composed numerous musicals.

Neighbors And Lovers
Taylor's first musical show was Neighbors And Lovers (1987), self-produced at the Oast Theatre, Tonbridge, England. However, Taylor decided to abandon it in favour of creating a musical based on a universally known story.

Wuthering Heights
Taylor selected Emily Brontë's classic Wuthering Heights, composing the music. A concept album was released in 1991 with a cast of West End musical stars including a former "Phantom Of The Opera" Dave Willetts, as Heathcliff,  Lesley Garrett (Cathy Earnshaw), Bonnie Langford (Isabella Linton), Clive Carter (Hindley Earnshaw), Sharon Campbell (Ellen "Nelly" Dean) and James Staddon (Edgar Linton). It had its world premier at the Madison Theatre, Illinois, in 1993 and has since been performed in the UK, Germany, Australia, New Zealand,The Netherlands, Poland and Romania.

Make Me a Musical
Meanwhile, Taylor turned his attention to something entirely different. The show (originally entitled  Success! and renamed in 2009)  was a backstage musical, loosely based on Faust, and set in New York. Peppered with parody and pastiche, with additional lyrics by Vivian Wadham, its typical, and often cynical, view of the ups and downs of show business was accompanied by a jazzy and sometimes tender score, with Claire Moore, Lon Satton, Kathryn Evans, Jessica Martin and Maurice Clarke forming the CD cast.  The musical was revamped in 2006 and retitled "Make Me a Musical".

Pride And Prejudice
By the time Success! made its debut at the Civic Theatre, Rotherham, in September 1995, Taylor had returned to the classics, in the form of Jane Austen's Pride And Prejudice. With Claire Moore as Elizabeth Bennett and Peter Karrie in the role of Darcy, the concept album also featured Gay Soper, Janet Mooney, James Staddon and Christopher Biggins as Mr. Collins. Stand-out tracks, according to the Virgin Encyclopedia of Film and Stage Music (VEFSM),  were considered to be "Through The Eyes Of A Child" "Good Breeding" and "Thank God They're Married". Pride And Prejudice was introduced to US audiences, complete with five new songs, by the Public Theatre Company of Peoria, Illinois, in January 1995. Taylor's musical interpretation of the Austen novel was considered to be closer to its source than the 1959 Broadway version (see VEFSM),  First Impressions (Austen's original title for the book), which starred Hermione Gingold. By 2012 there had been more than 30 productions of the show worldwide in the US,  UK, Germany, Australia, Ireland, New Zealand, Brazil and the USA.

Nosferatu the Vampire
This production, (with additional lyrics by Eric Vickers), included numbers such as "Wild Talk Of Vampires", "And Sheep Shall Not Safely Graze", "Worms Feed On My Brains" "Ship Of The Dead" "Blasphemy" and "Somewhere At The Edges Of Creation". Once again, the album cast was led by Claire Moore (singer) (as Mina) and Peter Karrie (as Nosferatu), supported by Mario Frangoulis, former pop star Mark Wynter, Barry James, Annalene Beechey and Simon Burke. The world premiere was staged at the Madison Theatre, Peoria, Illinois, in September 1995, and the show had its first European performances a month later in Eastbourne. The work has been translated into German, Spanish and Hungarian.

Much Ado
Having achieved considerable success with his adaptations on Brontë and Austen, Taylor looked to William Shakespeare's Much Ado About Nothing, abbreviated to Much Ado (additional lyrics: Vickers). The CD cast included Paul McGann (Benedick), Claire Moore (Beatrice), Simon Burke (Claudio), Janet Mooney (Hero), Barry James (Leonato), David Pendelbury (Dogberry) and Peter Karrie (Don John). Songs included "If I Could Write A Sonnet", "I'll Never Love Again", "The Sweetest Kiss", "Now I Hear Symphonies" and "This Strange Affliction Called Love" as well as the humorous "The Officers Of The Watch" and "Never Satisfied". It had its world premiere at Stratford on Avon, birthplace of Shakespeare, in 1996, and had its Continental European premiere in Budapest, Hungary, in 2006. The work was translated by Lőrincz Levente, directed by Benkő Péter, and the main roles were played by Udvarias Anna (Beatrice), Lőrincz Levente (Benedick), Bardóczy Attila (Don Pedro), Czakó Ádám (Claudio), Zseni Zsuzsa (Hero), Fekete István (Leonato), Monori Balázs (Dogberry), Cservenák Vilmos (Don John).

Millennium Suite
As the 1990s drew to a close, Taylor, in collaboration with orchestrator Gareth Price, attempted "to portray some of the key developments in the advance of civilization over the past 1,000 years" via his Millennium Suite. Performed on CD by the Polish State Philharmonic Orchestra of Latowice, conducted by Jerzy Swoboda, the suite consisted of "The Birth Of Chivalry" "The Age Of Oppression" "The Enlightenment" "The Road To Democracy" and "The Triumph of Democracy".

Passion's Progress
Encouraged by his latest reviews, Taylor composed another symphonic work, Passion's Progress, a suite of ten pieces tracing the development of a romantic relationship.

After featuring on the majority of Taylor's concept albums, Claire Moore, who has starred in the West End in shows such as Aspects Of Love and The Phantom Of The Opera, released the solo CDs, "Songs From The Musicals Of Bernard J. Taylor" and "Child Of The Earth".

Liberty: The Siege of the Alamo
The end of the decade saw the creation of Liberty: The Siege of the Alamo, which had its world premiere at the Josephine Theater in San Antonio in 2000. It was translated into Spanish in 2003 by the Mexican playwright Erick Merino, who also translated Nosferatu in 1998.

Snow White and The Evil Queen
Around 2004 Taylor began work on a series of four comic operas using the music of classical composers whose music was out of copyright. Taylor said he hoped to bring the music of the classical composers to a wider audience through these works. The first of these was "Snow White and The Evil Queen", which takes the classic fairy tale and gives the "Evil Queen" a more central role.  Instead of a "mirror mirror on the wall", the story features a masochistic hairdresser who acts as the queen's stylist as well as her vanity mirror.  The show uses the music of Beethoven and a section of his Violin Concerto becomes a Snow White song – "No More Miss Nice Girl" –  while his 5th Symphony is used for the song "Snow White Must Die".  A recording of the show was made at the J.B. Sowards Theatre in Ashland, Kentucky, in 2010 and featured on YouTube.

The Corporate Pirate of Penzance
For this show, completed in 2007,  Taylor took a number of the most popular songs of Gilbert and Sullivan and incorporated them into a more modern story of a corporate mogul (a Franchise King, also known as the Corporate Pirate of Penzance) who is hoping his daughter will marry into the British aristocracy, and a penniless young poet who falls in love with the daughter. The show uses music from Pirates of Penzance, H.M.S. Pinafore, The Mikado, Iolanthe, Trial by Jury and The Gondoliers, mixing the music of Arthur Sullivan and the words of W.S. Gilbert with lyrics that reflect the modernized narrative. In 2011 the Texas Light Opera Company was set up by Nicole Erwin, in conjunction with the Josephine Theatre in San Antonio, Texas, to produce the show in 2012 as the first in a series of productions of the comic operas.

Cinderella's Christmas Makeover
In 2008 Taylor began to revamp the Cinderella fairy tale using the music of Leo Delibes, W.A. Mozart, J.S. Bach, Jules Massenet, Carl Maria von Weber, Antonín Dvořák, Luigi Boccherini, Edvard Grieg, Josef Haydn, Felix Mendelssohn, Frédéric Chopin, Jacques Offenbach, P.I. Tchaikovsky, and Camille St Saens. He also composed four additional pieces of music. In Taylor's version, Cinderella is given a make-over for a reality show and gets to meet a prince who falls immediately in love with her.  But Cinderella rejects the prince because she is disturbed by his obsession with whether or not her feet will fit a glass slipper.  She falls for a penniless courtier who rescues her from the slave traders to whom her stepmother tries to sell her. The show ends with the couple entering and winning a national talent show.

The Marsh King's Daughter
One of Hans Christian Andersen's lesser-known fairy tales is considerably expanded and re-worked by Taylor in a comic opera using the music of Wolfgang Amadeus Mozart.  This was completed in 2010. All four comic operas, plus two plays, were published in Britain by Stagescripts Ltd in 2010.

The Road to Madness
Completed at the end of 2012, it is a chamber musical about the life of F. Scott Fizgerald and his relationships with Zelda Sayre and Ernest Hemingway. Fitzgerald is interviewed after his death and relives some of the key moments in his life. It has a cast of four. It was produced in San Antonio in 2015.

Rock n Roll Cafe
Begun in 2012, the libretto and songs were completed at the beginning of 2013. It is about the  life of the young in a mid-size town during the heyday of rock n' roll.

Backstage at Oz

New Guy at School
Completed at the beginning of 2013 in tandem with Rock n Roll Cafe, this is an updated version of Tom Brown's Schooldays, the classic 19th Century novel by Thomas Hughes (which created the blueprint for all school stories that followed, including Harry Potter). It features all the main characters from the original novel, but in this version it is set in a modern co-ed school. It was written especially for school productions.

Transformation

A Christmas Carol

Plays
Taylor has written numerous plays, mostly between 2010 and 2020.

Living with Ghosts
This tells the story of an introverted and burned-out writer who ends a hollow relationship with a married woman at the same time as he rents a room in his city apartment to an extrovert out-of-towner named Rachel, a generation younger than himself. He is torn between his attraction to her, his self-consciousness and his fear of involvement. The show was first performed in embryo in San Antonio, Texas, at the beginning of 2012.  It has since been extensively revised.

Haunted
Newlyweds Eddie and Janine buy a house in the country. The house has been untenanted for a few years and the furniture of the previous owner are covered with dust sheets.  They learn that the house was owned a couple who are now dead. Then they learn disturbing learn disturbing facts about the house's history. Things come to a head one night when an explosive incident leads to an exposure of the true nature of events.  This is also available as a screenplay.

Appalachian Ghosts

The Lady of Shalott
This play with music was published by Stagescripts in the UK as "Hear a Song That Echoes. Inspired by the epic poem by Alfred Lord Tennyson, it tells the story of a young literary professor who keeps the world at a distance until she is challenged by the passion of a former student. It received its first try-out in San Antonio in 2015.

The Deconstruction of Doctor Gerald Ackerman
Completed in 2011, this tells of a prominent psychiatrist who is put through sensory deprivation and "deconstructed" by a friend of the daughter he abused as a child. It is adapted from a novel that Taylor has subsequently withdrawn from circulation.

The Deliverer
Adapted from another novel that Taylor has withdrawn from circulation, it is about a man who kills women he meets through the internet in the belief that he is doing them a favor by ending their miserable lives and sending them to a better place. The play was completed early in 2012.

The Kindness of Strangers
In 2018, solo theatre artist Jade Esteban Estrada starred in the San Antonio production of Taylor's The Kindness of Strangers, a one-person show about the life of Tennessee Williams. Playwright Mark Leonard lauded Estrada's "brilliant, energetic portrayal of Williams. Both Taylor and Estrada deftly sidestep the cloying cliches to offer a gripping and vastly entertaining hour or so in the company of an American genius bent on self-destruction. Their Tennessee has heart, soul, rage and wit and it is well worth spending an evening entranced and entertained in his company."

Theatre for Scandal
Theatre for Scandal is a comedy loosely inspired by Sheridan's School for Scandal. When Anthony Hamilton hears there is a rumor that he is secretly straight, he claims to be outraged by the rumor and threatens to sue. His attention is soon diverted, however, when a female member of the group breaks down after being unceremoniously dumped by her lothario boyfriend, Alfonso, for another woman. Hamilton comes to her aid and promises to teach the jilter a lesson.  He investigates the jilter's movement and learns that the lothario meets regularly with his new girlfriend at the Cozy Corner coffee bar. At one of these rendezvous Hamilton appears and accuses Alfonso of two-timing him with a woman.  Alfonso is outraged at the suggestion that he and Hamilton (who have never met before) are lovers. He threatens Hamilton, who in turn eggs him on and warns Alfonso that he has a black belt in karate. Horrified by the prospect of losing a physical battle to such an effeminate and smaller person, Alfonso backs off. The play ends with the jilted girlfriend and Hamilton embarking on a new kind of relationship for both of them.

Waltzing in The Dark

The Last Days of Oscar Wilde

References

External links
Taylor's website
Taylor's Youtube Channel
Light Opera website

BDSM writers
Living people
South African emigrants to the United Kingdom
British emigrants to the United States
American musical theatre composers
British musical theatre composers
Year of birth missing (living people)
American mystery writers
English mystery writers
American male novelists